Kepler-70, also known as KIC 5807616 and formerly as KOI-55, is a star in the constellation Cygnus with an apparent visual magnitude of 14.87, and is 4200 light-years away. This is too faint to be seen with the naked eye; viewing it requires a telescope with an aperture of
 or more.
A subdwarf B star, Kepler-70 passed through the red giant stage some 18.4 million years ago. In its present-day state, it is fusing helium in its core. Once it runs out of helium it will contract to form a white dwarf. It has a relatively small radius of about 0.2 times the Sun's radius; white dwarfs are generally much smaller. The star may be host to a planetary system with two planets, although later research indicates that this is not in fact the case. If they are confirmed to exist, then the innermost planet has the highest temperature of any known planet.

Properties 

Kepler-70 is an sdB (B-type subdwarf star with a temperature of 27,730 K, equivalent to that of a B0-type star. The star was an evolutionary giant less than 20 million years ago.

Kepler-70 is still fusing. When it runs out of helium, it will contract into a white dwarf.

Planetary system
On December 26, 2011, evidence for two extremely short-period planets, Kepler-70b and Kepler-70c, was announced by Charpinet et al. They were detected by the reflection of starlight caused by the planets themselves, rather than through a variation in apparent stellar magnitude caused by them transiting the star.

The measurements also suggested a smaller body between the two candidate planets; this remains unconfirmed.

If these planets exist, then the orbits of Kepler-70b and Kepler-70c have 7:10 orbital resonance and have the closest approach between planets of any known planetary system. However, later research suggested that what had been detected was not in fact the reflection of light from exoplanets, but star pulsation "visible beyond the cut-off frequency of the star." Further research indicated that star pulsation modes were indeed the more likely explanation for the signals found in 2011, and that the two exoplanets probably did not exist.

If Kepler-70b exists, then it has a temp of 7288 K, the same as that of an F0 star.

Notes

References

External links
 Kepler mission discoveries

 
Cygnus (constellation)
55
Hypothetical planetary systems
Planetary transit variables
B-type subdwarfs